Lawrence Magnus Hagen (April 4, 1904 – June 8, 1992) was a politician in the State of Wisconsin.

Biography
Hagen was born in Black River Falls, Wisconsin. In 1926, he married Inez McLaughlin (1906–1973). In 1974, Hagen married Hazel Florence Sanderson (1902–1996). Hagen died in Superior, Wisconsin.

Career
Hagen was employed as a machinist and railroad worker. Hagen served as a member of the Wisconsin State Assembly from Douglas County 2nd District (1953 to 1958). Hagen also served on the Superior Common Council. Aside from politics, he worked as a machinist and a railroad worker.

References

External links

1904 births
1992 deaths
People from Black River Falls, Wisconsin
Politicians from Superior, Wisconsin
American people of Norwegian descent
Wisconsin city council members
Republican Party members of the Wisconsin State Assembly
Machinists
20th-century American politicians